Samuel Michael Patrick "Rosy" Dolan (1884 – December 30, 1944) was an American football player and coach.  He played for the University of Notre Dame and coached at Oregon State University, then known as Oregon Agricultural College.

Playing career
Dolan played football at Notre Dame from 1906 to 1909.  While at Notre Dame, Dolan was a four-year starter a right guard.  In his four seasons as a player, the Fighting Irish were 27–2–2.

Dolan also attended school at Oregon Agricultural College in 1909, however did not play football for OAC.

Collegiate coaching
In 1911, Dolan became the head football coach at Oregon State.  During that 1911 season, OAC did not play their in state rivals, the University of Oregon.  There was no Oregon–Oregon State football rivalry game that year due to a riot at the game the year before.  The OAC student body decided to cancel all athletic events between the two schools for the 1911 season.  The game was brought back for the 1912 season, however it was not played on the campus of OAC.  The game was moved to neutral site in Albany, Oregon.  The neutral field idea came from an Albany cigar-maker named Billy Eagles, who was the brother-in-law to Coach Dolan.

Dolan served as the head coach for two seasons, posting an 8–6 overall record.

Head coaching record

References

1884 births
1944 deaths
American football guards
Notre Dame Fighting Irish football players
Oregon State Beavers football coaches